Bucătaru is a Romanian language occupational surname derived from word bucătar, or "cook". It may refer to:

 Gabriel Bucataru, Romanian-American founder of Gabriel guitar amplifier manufacturer
 Olga Bucătaru, Romanian actress

Romanian-language surnames
Occupational surnames